Norway House Airport  is located adjacent to Norway House, Manitoba, Canada.

Airlines and destinations

See also
Norway House Water Aerodrome

References

External links

Certified airports in Manitoba